This is the discography for the American country rock musician Lissie.

Albums

Studio albums

Live albums

Compilation albums

Extended plays

Singles

Other appearances
These songs have been released on albums that were not a studio album released by Lissie.

Songs in other media

References

Country music discographies
Discographies of American artists
Rock music discographies